Club Atlético Cirbonero is a Spanish football team based in Cintruénigo in the autonomous community of Navarre. Founded in 1945, it plays in Segunda División RFEF – Group 2. Its stadium is Estadio San Juan with a capacity of 1,000.

History
In 2010, Atlético Cirbonero finished in the third position of the Group 14 of Tercera División and qualified for the first time to the promotion playoffs to Segunda División B, but was eliminated in the first round by Ayamonte CF.

Six years later, the club qualified again to the promotion playoffs, this time as runner-up of the Navarrese group, but it did not pass from the first round, where was beaten by CD Cayón.

In 2016, Atlético Cirbonero made its debut in the Copa del Rey. Despite being a Tercera División team, it beat SD Ponferradina and Racing de Ferrol, both Segunda División B, after the penalty shootout. In the 2018-19 season the club finished 7th in the group 15 of the Tercera División.

Season to season

1 season in Segunda División RFEF
22 seasons in Tercera División
1 season in Tercera División RFEF

References

External links
Futbolme team profile  
CA Cirbonero on Futnavarra.es 
CA Cirbonero on desdelabanda.es 
Team profile 

Football clubs in Navarre
Association football clubs established in 1945
1945 establishments in Spain